Durack is an outer south-western suburb in the City of Brisbane, Queensland, Australia.

Geography 

History 
Durack is named after Michael Durack, one of the original landholders of the area at Archerfield pastoral station. It was given this name in 1976 from a naming competition in a local newspaper.

Serviceton State School opened on 27 January 1959. On 1 January 2001, it was renamed Durack State School.

Inala State High School opened on 30 January 1962. It closed on 15 December 1995 to amalgamate with Richlands State High School to create Glenala State High School on the Inala State High School site. Despite the name, Inala State High School was in Durack on the north-east corner of Glenala Road and Hampton Street.

Brisbane Muslim School opened in Buranda in 2002. In 2005, the school moved to Durack and was renamed Australian International Islamic College.

The median age of the Durack population was 38 years of age, 1 year above the Australian median. 54.6% of people living in Durack were born in Australia, compared to the national average of 69.8%; the next most common countries of birth were Vietnam 14.3%, New Zealand 3.9%, England 3.2%, Samoa 1.5%, Philippines 1.4%. 54.4% of people spoke only English at home; the next most popular languages were 23.2% Vietnamese, 3.1% Samoan, 1.3% Arabic, 0.9% Tagalog, 0.9% Spanish.

Education
Durack State School is a government primary (Prep-6) school for boys and girls at 69 Inala Avenue. In 2017, the school had an enrolment of 593 students with 45 teachers (40 full-time equivalent) and 36 non-teaching staff (23 full-time equivalent). It includes a special education program.

Glenala State High School is a government secondary (7-12) school for boys and girls at Glenala Road. In 2017, the school had an enrolment of 790 students with 72 teachers (70 full-time equivalent) and 40 non-teaching staff (30 full-time equivalent). It includes a special education program.

Australian International Islamic College is a private primary and secondary (Prep-12) school for boys and girls at 724 Blunder Road. In 2017, the school had an enrolment of 613 students with 45 teachers (42 full-time equivalent) and 31 non-teaching staff (25 full-time equivalent).

Community facilities 
Phap Quang Temple, a Vietnamese Buddhist temple is located in the suburb.

Transport
The suburb is linked to Salisbury railway station and the Brisbane CBD by bus route 100. The suburb is also linked to Richlands railway station by bus route 460.

References

External links

 
 
 TRANSLink website route information 466

Suburbs of the City of Brisbane
Populated places established in 1976
1976 establishments in Australia